The 1927 South Dakota Coyotes football team was an American football team that represented the University of South Dakota in the North Central Conference (NCC) during the 1927 college football season. In its first season under head coach Vincent E. Montgomery, the team compiled a 7–2 record (5–0 against NCC opponents), tied for the NCC championship, and outscored opponents by a total of 143 to 105.

Schedule

References

South Dakota
South Dakota Coyotes football seasons
North Central Conference football champion seasons
South Dakota Coyotes football